Here is a list of supervillains appearing in DC Comics who are or have been enemies of the superhero Superman. Several of Superman's opponents (most notably Darkseid and Brainiac) are or have been foes of the Justice League as well. Unlike most heroes, Superman's adversaries exist in every known capacity; humans, metahumans, androids, sorcerers, empowered animals, other aliens (such as Kryptonians), mythical/supernatural creatures, corrupt doppelgängers of himself (imposters, clones, or parallel universe counterparts), interdimensional beings (Mr. Mxyzpltk, Vyndktvx), and even deities.

Central rogues gallery
In alphabetical order (with issue and date of first appearance):

Foes of lesser renown
In alphabetical order (with issue and date of first appearance):

 In addition, Superman has fought many aliens.

Group villains

Antiheroes and reformed, semi-reformed, or occasionally reformed supervillains
The following is a list of Superman enemies who have reformed and are more often depicted as allies of alien than enemies.

Allies in conflict
Some characters originally conceived as heroes have come into conflict with Superman.

Enemies created for other media
These are Superman villains created in other media, with no appearances in previous comics.

Villains from comics in other media
A number of villains from the comic books have made an appearance, or appearances, in Superman related live-action media.

See also
 List of Aquaman enemies
 List of Batman family enemies
 List of Flash enemies
 Rogues
 List of Green Lantern enemies
 List of Hawkman enemies
 List of Wonder Woman enemies

References

Enemies
Lists of DC Comics characters
 
Lists of DC Comics supervillains
Lists of fictional superhuman characters